Makhehlene Makhaula (born 17 November 1989) is a South African soccer player who plays as a midfielder for South African Premier Division Orlando Pirates who were recent MTN 8 champions and also gunning for the African championship spot. ref></ref>

References

Living people
1989 births
South African soccer players
People from Rand West City Local Municipality
Soccer players from Gauteng
Association football midfielders
Free State Stars F.C. players
Highlands Park F.C. players
AmaZulu F.C. players
South African Premier Division players